Haarlemsche Football Club Eendracht Doet Overwinnen (Dutch: Haarlemsche Football Club Unity Makes Win), known as HFC EDO or just EDO,  is an amateur association football club in Haarlem, Netherlands. It competes in the 2017–18 Eerste Klasse league.

External links
 Official site

Football clubs in the Netherlands
Football clubs in Haarlem
Association football clubs established in 1897
1897 establishments in the Netherlands